Guy Maurice McIntyre (born February 17, 1961) is a former professional American football offensive lineman in the National Football League (NFL). He played in three Super Bowls and five Pro Bowls as a member of the San Francisco 49ers.

McIntyre was one of the first linemen in the modern age of the NFL to be used as a blocking back/fullback (in Bill Walsh's "Angus" short-yardage formation); it was when this offense was used in the 1984 NFC Championship Game in the defeat of the Chicago Bears that motivated Bears coach Mike Ditka to use the same formation the following year, with William Perry, the "Refrigerator" as the blocking back, though Perry would also be used as a runner.

McIntyre starred at Georgia from 1979-1983, where he was a team captain in 1983 and an SEC champion in 1981 and 1982. The Thomasville native won the Jacobs Blocking Trophy in 1983 - or best SEC lineman - as voted by SEC coaches. He was named All-SEC in 1982 and 1983 and a second-team All American in 1983. 

McIntyre attended Thomasville High School, where he played high school football for the Bulldogs.

Personal
Guy joined the prestigious Silicon Valley Leadership Group.
Guy is working toward publishing his book of memoirs.
Guy looks toward to attending Graduate School.

References

1961 births
Living people
People from Thomasville, Georgia
Players of American football from Georgia (U.S. state)
Georgia Bulldogs football players
Green Bay Packers players
Philadelphia Eagles players
San Francisco 49ers players
National Conference Pro Bowl players